Bashtown is the fourth studio album, and eighth album overall, released by the American hip hop recording artist Baby Bash. Released on March 22, 2011, it is the first of his albums to be released on Upstairs Records. Bashtown was produced by Jim Jonsin, Printz Board, Happy Perez, Mickaël, J. Lacy, & C-Ballin and has vocal guests E-40, Paul Wall, Slim Thug, Jay Rock, Marty James, The Jacka, Z-Ro, Krizz Kaliko, Lucky Luciano and Lloyd among others. According to Baby Bash, the album was recorded entirely in 2010, although many singles and the album were released in 2011.

Singles 
The album has six singles in total, three of them being promotional and three official. The first promotional Single was "Buttakup" released on March 30, 2010. The song was produced by and featured J. Lacy and contained more of an R&B style. "Fantasy Girl", released on July 13, 2010, was a retro-dance influenced track featuring vocals by the One Block Radius singer Marty James who has worked with many artists such as Snoop Dogg, E-40 and Tech N9ne. The third  promotional single "Good for My Money", features Lloyd, and was released on October 5, 2010.

The first official single, "Go Girl", which features E-40, is a pop rap track and was released on November 30, 2010. Currently, "Go Girl" has been the most successful song on the album. The second single, "Swanananana", released on March 8, 2011, features Slim Thug and Da Stooie Bros. This single is considered very similar to Baby Bash and T-Pain's 2007 hit "Cyclone". The third official single is "Head Hunta", featuring the rap artists Z-Ro and Lucky Luciano, and was released on March 22, 2011.

Reception

Reviews 

The album received generally mixed reviews. Critics Jeremy Carmona from Yo! Raps said that the album is "club influenced" similar to his previous album, Cyclone. David Jeffries from Allmusic described it as "his best effort since his major-label debut, Tha Smokin' Nephew".

Commercial performance 
Bashtown  charted on Billboard peaking at #38 on the R&B/Hip-Hop Albums chart. In the second week, Bashtown fell to #61 on the same chart. Bashtown also charted on Billboard Independent albums at #31 and Top Rap Albums at #19. To date the album has sold 6,000 copies in the US.

Track listing 
Confirmed by iTunes, Amazon, and writers by Allmusic, and producers from CD Inlay.

Personnel 
By Allmusic.

 Baby Bash: lead vocals, composer, executive producer
 Chris Athens: mastering
 C-Ballin: producer
 Printz Board: drum programming, engineer, keyboards, producer, vocal engineer, performer
 Todd Cooper: mixing
 Steve Dang: producer
 Howard "DJ Rex" Huang: mastering, mixing
 Michael Denten: mastering, mixing
 Happy P: mixing, producer
 James Hoover: mixing
 Chris Jackson: composer
 Mario "Tex" James: composer
 Marty James: performer, composer
 Jim Jonsin: producer, composer
 J. Lacy: mixing, performer
 John Lopez: executive producer
 Roy Mata: engineer
 Z-RO: performer, composer

 Jose Melendez: project manager
 David Newton: composer
 Ocies Groceries: producer
 Sergio Peña: project coordinator
 Lloyd Polite: performer, composer
 Elvin Reyes: artwork
 Manuel Rosenthal: composer
 Marc Rustigian: mastering
 Damon Sharpe: vocal engineer
 Paul Wall: performer, composer
 Adrian Sidney: photography
 Slim Thug: performer, composer
 Omar "O.C." Townsend: performer, composer
 Jay Tee: performer, composer
 Krizz Kaliko: performer, composer
 Michael Zibi: engineer, mixing, producer
 Dave Fore: mixing engineer
 Phil Fuger: engineer

Chart positions

References 

2011 albums
Baby Bash albums
Albums produced by Jim Jonsin